The Imperial Trans-Antarctic Expedition was an attempt to cross the Antarctic continent led by Ernest Shackleton. The personnel were divided into two groups: the Weddell Sea party consisting of the men who would attempt the crossing and their support, and the Ross Sea party whose job it was to lay stores on the far side of the Pole for the members of the Weddell Sea party who would make the crossing. Both arms of the expedition had a final complement of 28 men. The Weddell Sea party's ship Endurance was crushed in pack ice and the crossing attempt was never made. All the Weddell Sea party were rescued, but several members of the Ross Sea party perished after their support ship Aurora broke free from its mooring post and drifted away, leaving the shore party stranded.

Names and dates of birth are included where known. After Endurance was lost, the Weddell Sea party spent some months camped on the ice before making for Elephant Island in the three lifeboats salvaged from the vessel, the James Caird, the Dudley Docker and the Stancomb Wills. The boat each man was assigned to for the crossing is listed.

Some of the original crew left the expedition to sign up when war was declared with Germany, and others returned to England after the ship put in at Buenos Aires.

Weddell Sea party

Ross Sea party

Notes

References

External links
 The Endurance Obituauries, The story of the men of Sir Ernest Shackleton's ship S.Y. Endurance, at Enduranceobituaries.co.uk.
 Crew member biographies, including sizeable entries on some of the least well-known, at Coolantarctica.com.

Imperial Trans-Antarctic Expedition
Antarctica-related lists